The 2012 South American Under-20 Women's Football Championship was the 5th edition of the South American Under-20 Women Championship. It was held from 20 January to 5 February in Brazil. The winners, and the runners-up, were qualified for the 2012 FIFA U-20 Women's World Cup held in Japan.

Participating teams

 (Hosts)

First stage
Matches were played in Curitiba, Paranaguá and Ponta Grossa.

Group A

Group B

Final stage

The winner and the runner-up teams qualify for the 2012 FIFA U-20 Women's World Cup in Japan.

Top goalscorers
players with at least three goals 
9 goals
 Ketlen
7 goals
 Thaisinha
6 goals
 Betina Soriano
4 goals
 Florencia Bonsegundo
3 goals
 Beatriz
 Gláucia
 Jetzabeth
 Cuevas

References

External links
Official Site
futbol24
South American U-20 Championship 2012 on WomensSoccerUnited.com

South American U-20 Women Championship
South American U-20 Women's Championship
Women U-20 Championship
2012
South
2012 in youth association football